Diane M Sutherland (born 1955), is a female former swimmer who competed for England.

Swimming career
She represented England and won a bronze medal in the 4 x 100 metres medley relay, at the 1970 British Commonwealth Games in Edinburgh, Scotland.

Sutherland represented the Sutton and Cheam Swimming Club.

References

1955 births
Living people
English female swimmers
Commonwealth Games medallists in swimming
Commonwealth Games bronze medallists for England
Swimmers at the 1970 British Commonwealth Games
Medallists at the 1970 British Commonwealth Games